Chobhar (or Chovar, or Chobar) is a village in Kathmandu District in the Bagmati Zone of central Nepal and part of Kirtipur Municipality. At the time of the 1991 Nepal census it had a population of 5,627 living in 1,109 households.

Chobhar is known for the nearby Chobhar Gorge where there are the Chobhar caves. There is also a temple, Jal Binayak Temple and Adinath Lokeshwar And Chobhar Hills that is sacred to both Buddhists and Hindus. There are beautiful herbs and suburbs along with limestone adding its more beauty in the town.

One of the biggest income generation of this village is through the supply of water and the tourist site Manjushree Park.

References

Populated places in Kathmandu District